Yvonne Joan Kainuku (born 1968) is a New Zealand former cricketer who played as a right-arm fast-medium bowler. She appeared in 1 Test match and 2 One Day Internationals for New Zealand in 1992. She played domestic cricket for Auckland.

References

External links

1968 births
Living people
Cricketers from Auckland
New Zealand women cricketers
New Zealand women Test cricketers
New Zealand women One Day International cricketers
Auckland Hearts cricketers